Sergei Anatolyevich Babkov (born 5 June 1967 in Biysk, USSR) is a retired Russian professional basketball player.

Professional career
Babkov was the Top Scorer of the German League, in 1994.

National team career
Babkov was a part of the senior Russian national basketball team that won silver medals at the 1994 FIBA World Championship (in the gold medal game, he led all scorers with 22 points) and the 1998 FIBA World Championship.

References

1967 births
Living people
Baloncesto Málaga players
Joventut Badalona players
Liga ACB players
Point guards
Russian expatriate sportspeople in Germany
Russian expatriate basketball people in Spain
Russian men's basketball players
Shooting guards
1998 FIBA World Championship players
1994 FIBA World Championship players
Sportspeople from Novosibirsk